Nicola Baldwin is a British playwright and scriptwriter.

Life
She wrote for "Where the Heart Is (1997 TV series)",
and "Have Your Cake" for BBC Radio 4.

Awards
1993 George Devine Award
1993 Time Out Award, Best New Play

Works
Confetti, Oval House Theatre, London, 1992; The Last Refuge, London, 2012; Map Studio, London, 2012
Undeveloped Land, Chelsea Theatre, London, 1993
The Gift, Y Touring Theatre Company, 1995
Cracked, Y Touring Theatre Company, 1996
23:59, Crucible Theatre, Sheffield, 1999
The Rib Cage, Royal Exchange Theatre Studio, Manchester, 1999
Leap of Faith, Y Touring Theatre and National Theatre Education, Albany Theatre, London, 2005
The Thirteenth Devil, BBC Radio 4, Afternoon Play, 2006
Beowulf, Ball Court, Prior Park College, Bath, 2007
Metropolis, Ball Court, Prior Park College, Bath, 2008
Seven Scenes, BBC Radio 3, The Wire, 2011
Tony and Rose, BBC Radio 4, Afternoon Play, 2013
Blackshirts, Royal National Theatre Studio, 2013
All Saints, The Last Refuge, London, 2013; The Kings Head, London, 2013
Hotel Bastille, Camden People’s Theatre, London, 2014

References

External links
"Writing The Gift: Nicola Baldwin", Y Touring Theatre company
 Nicola Baldwin website
 Nicola Baldwin at Royal Literary Fund
 Nicola Baldwin on IMDb
 Nicola Baldwin films at Lux

British dramatists and playwrights
Year of birth missing (living people)
Living people